Squirrel Creek is a  long 1st order tributary to the Banister River in Pittsylvania County, Virginia.

Course 
Squirrel Creek rises at Riceville, Virginia in Pittsylvania County and then flows northeast to join the Banister River about 2 miles south of Hermosa.

Watershed 
Squirrel Creek drains  of area, receives about 45.3 in/year of precipitation, has a wetness index of 346.92, and is about 70% forested.

See also 
 List of Virginia Rivers

References 

Rivers of Virginia
Rivers of Pittsylvania County, Virginia
Tributaries of the Roanoke River